Raymond Victor "Vic" Rouse (born 16 March 1936) is a Welsh former footballer and coach. Rouse played at both professional and international levels as a goalkeeper, before becoming a football manager.

Career

Playing career
Born in Swansea, Rouse played in the English Football League for Crystal Palace, Oxford United and Leyton Orient. He was also a player with Millwall (as an amateur) and Northampton Town without making a League appearance for either club. Rouse later played in the North American Soccer League for the Atlanta Chiefs.

Rouse earned one cap at full international level for Wales. Rouse became the first ever international player from the old Fourth Division when he appeared in 1959.

Coaching career
Rouse was player-manager of the Chiefs between 1969 and 1972. After retiring as a player in 1972, he returned to England to become manager of Metropolitan Police. He was still managing Metropolitan Police as of 1982.

References

1936 births
Living people
Welsh footballers
Wales international footballers
Wales under-23 international footballers
Welsh football managers
Millwall F.C. players
Crystal Palace F.C. players
Northampton Town F.C. players
Oxford United F.C. players
Leyton Orient F.C. players
Atlanta Chiefs players
English Football League players
National Professional Soccer League (1967) players
North American Soccer League (1968–1984) players
Association football goalkeepers
Atlanta Chiefs coaches
Metropolitan Police F.C. managers
Welsh expatriate sportspeople in the United States
Expatriate soccer players in the United States
Welsh expatriate footballers